The Dhaka Dynamites are a franchise cricket team based in Dhaka, Bangladesh, which plays in the Bangladesh Premier League (BPL). They were one of the seven teams that competed in the 2016 Bangladesh Premier League. The team was captained by Shakib Al Hasan.

Player draft
The 2016 BPL draft was held on 30 September. Prior to the draft, the seven clubs signed 38 foreign players to contracts and each existing franchise was able to retain two home-grown players from the 2015 season. A total 301 players participated in the draft, including 133 local and 168 foreign players. 85 players were selected in the draft.

Player transfers
Prior to the 2016 draft, a number of high-profile players moved teams. These included transfers between competing teams and due to the suspension of the Shakib Al Hasan as team captain of Dhaka Dynamites from Rangpur Riders.

Owners and sponsorship 
The owners of the Dynamites is Beximco, a company specialising in producing clothing materials. Beximco produces textiles, basic chemicals, pharmaceuticals, jute and marine foods; the company also has real estate and land development interests. Bangladesh Export Import Company (BEXIMCO) is a Bangladeshi industrial conglomerate. The industries under this Group include Textiles, Basic Chemicals and Pharmaceuticals, Jute, Marine Foods, Real Estate and Development. Services provided by Beximco include Engineering, Media, Information Technology, Trade and Financial Services. Beximco Pharmaceuticals and Shinepukur Ceramics are the two units which has got world class factory.

In 2012 and 2013, sponsorship of the then-Gladiators was bought by BBS Cables for 112.50 million for each season, Oriental Group bought co-sponsorship for 15 million for each season. Beximco secured the sponsorship for the team during the third season.

Administration and support staff 

 Owners – Ahmed Shayan Fazlur Rahman, Salman F Rahman (Beximco Holdings Limited)
 Brand Ambassador – Aurthohin
 Team Manager – Azizur Rahim
CEO – Obeid Nizam
COO - Mehran H. Chowdhury
Head Coach – Khaled Mahmud
Physio – Md.Amanat Ullah Moon

Standings 

 The top four teams will qualify for playoffs
  advanced to the Qualifier
  advanced to the Eliminator

League stage

Playoffs

Qualifier 1

Final

Squad

Statistics

References 

Bangladesh Premier League